Carl Wilhelm Christian Malchin (14 May 1838, Kröpelin - 23 January 1923, Schwerin) was a German landscape painter and art conservator.

Life 
His father was a member of the Mecklenburg legislature. He attended the Realschule in Rostock, then was apprenticed to a surveyor in Schwaan. He aspired to be a shipbuilder, but was not sufficiently strong and robust for that type of work, so he remained with the surveyor for three more years as his assistant. At this time, he made the acquaintance of two young painters from a nearby art colony who encouraged him to develop an interest in painting.

From 1860 to 1862, he attended the Polytechnikum in Munich, ostensibly to study geodesy and engineering but, instead, he frequented the local artists' studios where he got to know Adolf Heinrich Lier and began taking lessons from one of Lier's friends. Nevertheless, he finished his course at the Polytechnikum and, after a short training period in Rostock, took the engineering exam. He then worked in the land surveying office of the Grand Duchy of Mecklenburg-Schwerin and painted in his spare time.

His work attracted the attention of the Court Painter, Theodor Schloepke, who obtained a scholarship for him from Grand Duke Friedrich Franz II. He began his formal studies in 1873 at the Weimar Saxon-Grand Ducal Art School under Theodor Hagen.

Despite the scholarship, he experienced continuing financial problems. His paintings did not sell very well. Many were bought by the Grand Duke and his court for a nominal sum. Finally, in 1879, he was offered the position of art conservator and restorer for the Ducal collection. He was given a generous contract that allowed him plenty of space and time to pursue his own work. This freedom was used to travel extensively. The area around Ahrenshoop was especially inspiring to him.

In 1890, Grand Duke Friedrich Franz III appointed him a professor. After 1903, he lived in the village of Ostorf near Lake Schwerin. He retired in 1915 and was presented with the Knight's Cross of the Order of the Griffon. A proposed retrospective of his work had to be cancelled due to the war and was not presented until 1923, after his death. Approximately 260 of his paintings are in the possession of the  Staatliches Museum Schwerin. Ninety-two were destroyed during World War II. A street in Schwerin has been named after him.

Selected works

References

Further reading 
Lisa Jürß: Carl Malchin : ein Maler aus Mecklenburg : 1838 - 1923. Edition Fischerhuder Kunstbuch, 2009. 
Lisa Jürß: Carl Malchin. Ein mecklenburgischer Maler. Worpsweder Taschenbücher, 1991. 
Lisa Jürß: Carl Wilhelm Christian Malchin, Landschaftsmaler, Zeichner, Radierer. In: Biographisches Lexikon für Mecklenburg. Vol.6, pgs.198-203.

External links 

 ArtNet: More works by Malchin
 
 

1838 births
1923 deaths
People from Rostock (district)
People from the Grand Duchy of Mecklenburg-Schwerin
Landscape painters
19th-century German painters
German male painters
20th-century German painters
20th-century German male artists
Technical University of Munich alumni
19th-century German male artists